Dmitri Igorevich Akishin (born April 21, 1992) is a Russian professional ice hockey defenceman.

Akishin played with HC Dynamo Moscow of the Kontinental Hockey League (KHL) during the 2012–13 season.

References

External links

Living people
HC Dynamo Moscow players
Russian ice hockey defencemen
Sportspeople from Chelyabinsk
1992 births
Universiade medalists in ice hockey
Universiade gold medalists for Russia
Competitors at the 2015 Winter Universiade